Shalva (Georgian: შალვა) is a Georgian masculine given name. Notable people with the name include:

Shalva of Akhaltsikhe (fl. 13th century), Georgian military commander and courtier
Shalva Aleksi-Meskhishvili (1884-1960), Georgian jurist and politician 
Shalva Amiranashvili (1899–1975), Georgian art historian
Shalva Apkhazava (1980-2004), Georgian footballer 
Shalva Chikhladze (1912-1997), Georgian wrestler and Olympic medalist
Shalva Dadiani (1874-1959), Georgian novelist, playwright and theatre actor
Shalva Didebashvili (born 1982), Georgian rugby player
Shalva Eliava (1883–1937), Soviet-Georgian Old Bolshevik and Soviet official 
Shalva Gachechiladze (born 1987), Georgian show jumper
Shalva Gadabadze (born 1984), Georgian-Azerbaijani wrestler
Shalva Khujadze (born 1975), Georgian footballer
Shalva Kikodze (1894-1921), Georgian painter, graphic artist and theatre decorator 
Shalva Loladze (1916–1945), Soviet-Georgian officer in the German Wehrmacht
Shalva Maglakelidze (1893-1976), Georgian jurist, politician and military commander
Shalva Mamukashvili (born 1990), Georgian rugby player
Shalva Mumladze (born 1978), Georgian footballer 
Shalva Natelashvili (born 1958), Georgian politician
Shalva Nutsubidze (1888-1969), Georgian philosopher, translator and public benefactor
Shalva Sutiashvili (born 1984), Georgian rugby player

Georgian masculine given names